Townville is an unincorporated community in Anderson County, South Carolina, United States. Townville has a post office with ZIP Code 29689, which opened on December 13, 1836.

Geography 
Townville is located at  (34.521037, -82.880237).

See also 
2016 Townville Elementary School shooting

References

Unincorporated communities in Anderson County, South Carolina
Unincorporated communities in South Carolina